Sergei Konstantinovich Vaganov (born 1 July 1985) is a Russian former professional football player.

Club career
He played 9 seasons in the Russian Football National League for 6 different clubs.

External links
 
 

1985 births
People from Nizhny Novgorod Oblast
Living people
Russian footballers
Association football midfielders
FC Lokomotiv Nizhny Novgorod players
FC Nizhny Novgorod (2007) players
FC Mordovia Saransk players
FC Rotor Volgograd players
FC Luch Vladivostok players
FC Baltika Kaliningrad players
FC SKA-Khabarovsk players
FC Volga Nizhny Novgorod players
FC Nizhny Novgorod (2015) players
FC Nosta Novotroitsk players
Sportspeople from Nizhny Novgorod Oblast